Steve Hopkins, also known as Steven E. Hopkins and HipHopkins, is a music composer, producer and musician based in Los Angeles, California, United States. He is best known as co-writer of the theme music for the longest running daytime drama in history, General Hospital (ABC / Disney).

Awards and nominations

Early life
Steve Hopkins was born in New York State to a scientist father and professor mother. He started off playing drums professionally at the age of 16 in the casino showrooms of Atlantic City New Jersey, where he had to be escorted to & from the stage by security guards because he was too young to be in a casino. He eventually ended up touring extensively (as a musician) with Chuck Berry, Tennessee Ernie Ford, Florence Henderson, and Gloria Loring, before re-locating to California and re-inventing himself as a composer & producer.

References

Steve Hopkins at Internet Movie Database

External links

Living people
American television composers
Year of birth missing (living people)